The List of category 2 historic places in Auckland contains the category 2 heritage sites and buildings from Auckland registered in the New Zealand Heritage List/Rārangi Kōrero (formerly the Register).

This list is maintained and updated by Heritage New Zealand also known as Heritage New Zealand Pouhere Taonga, initially the National Historic Places Trust and, from 1963 to 2014, the New Zealand Historic Places Trust.

The list also includes known Wahi Tapu (Area), Māori culturally and religiously significant sites and areas. However, they are usually not published. The heritage buildings and areas in Auckland classified as Historic Place Category 1 or Historic Area are listed in the List of category 1 historic places in Auckland.

List

See also
 List of category 1 historic places in Auckland
 List of historic places in Wellington
 List of historic places in New Plymouth

References

Bibliography 
Heritage New Zealand,  New Zealand Heritage List

External links 

Buildings and structures in Auckland
Auckland